5642 Bobbywilliams, provisional designation , is an eccentric, stony asteroid and Mars-crosser from the inner regions of the asteroid belt, approximately 4.7 kilometers in diameter.

It was discovered on 27 July 1990, by American astronomer Henry E. Holt at Palomar Observatory in California, United States. The asteroid was named for JPL engineer Bobby Williams.

Orbit and classification 

Bobbywilliams orbits the Sun in the inner main-belt at a distance of 1.5–3.1 AU once every 3 years and 6 months (1,287 days). Its orbit has an eccentricity of 0.33 and an inclination of 25° with respect to the ecliptic. A first precovery was taken at the Australian Siding Spring Observatory in 1975, extending the body's observation arc by 15 years prior to its official discovery at Palomar.

Physical characteristics

Rotation period 

In July 2011, a rotational lightcurve of Bobbywilliams was obtained from photometric observations by astronomer Julian Oey at both the Australian Kingsgrove and Leura observatories. Lightcurve analysis gave a well-defined rotation period of  hours with a brightness variation of 0.05 magnitude.

Diameter and albedo 

The Collaborative Asteroid Lightcurve Link assumes a standard albedo for stony asteroids of 0.20 and calculates a diameter of 4.71 kilometers with an absolute magnitude of 14.0.

Naming 

This minor planet was named for Jet Propulsion Laboratory engineer Bobby G. Williams (born 1951), specialized in celestial mechanics and the navigation of space probes. He has been a leading navigation manager when NEAR Shoemaker had its rendezvous with the asteroids 253 Mathilde and 433 Eros, The official naming citation was published by the Minor Planet Center on 28 July 1999.

References

External links 
 Asteroid Lightcurve Database (LCDB), query form (info )
 Dictionary of Minor Planet Names, Google books
 Asteroids and comets rotation curves, CdR – Observatoire de Genève, Raoul Behrend
 Discovery Circumstances: Numbered Minor Planets (5001)-(10000) – Minor Planet Center
 
 

005642
Discoveries by Henry E. Holt
Named minor planets
19900727